Macrocheles coenosus is a species of mite in the family Macrochelidae.

References

coenosus
Articles created by Qbugbot
Animals described in 1996